Butts Park Arena is a multi-use sports stadium in Spon End, Coventry, England. Its main use is as a rugby stadium (both union and league). It is the home ground for Coventry R.F.C. (since its opening) and was the home of Midlands Hurricanes (who moved there for the start of the 2004–05 season as Coventry Bears). It was also formerly the home ground of the Coventry Jets, an American football team. From the 2017–18 season, the stadium is also the home of Coventry United, a non league football club and their Ladies team who play in the second tier FA Women's Championship.

The stadium has also hosted the local varsity day matches between Coventry University and the University of Warwick.

The stadium

The stadium was built in 2004 and currently has one stand, known for sponsorship reasons as the XL Motors stand, which has a capacity of 3,000 and includes a number of conference and banqueting facilities. The West Stand which was a temporary structure holding 1,000 was removed at the end of the 2005–06 season on grounds of health and safety.  There is also standing space for up to 1,000 supporters around the pitch.
It is on the site of the Butts cycling track

In June 2019 the pitch was replaced with an artificial playing surface.

Records
The record attendance for a match at the Butts Park Arena was 3,758 between Coventry R.F.C. and Hull Ionians, on 28 April 2018. This also became the record attendance for any match in National League 1.

References

External links
Ground

Coventry United W.F.C.
Sports venues in Coventry
Rugby league stadiums in England
Rugby union stadiums in England
Sports venues completed in 2004
2004 establishments in England
Football venues in England
American football venues in England